This is a summary of the electoral history of Vince Cable, former Secretary of State for Business, Innovation and Skills and President of the Board of Trade under the Coalition Government of David Cameron, MP for Twickenham 1997 to 2015 and again from 2017 to 2019, and Leader of the Liberal Democrats from 2017 to July 2019.

Council elections

1970 Glasgow Corporation election, Partick West

1971 Glasgow Corporation election, Maryhill

Parliamentary elections

1970 general election, Glasgow Hillhead

1983 general election, York

1987 general election, York

1992 general election, Twickenham

1997 general election, Twickenham

2001 general election, Twickenham

2005 general election, Twickenham

2010 general election, Twickenham

2015 general election, Twickenham

2017 general election, Twickenham

 gain

Liberal Democrats leadership elections

2006 deputy leadership election

David Heath was eliminated after the first round, and his second preferences were redistributed.

2017 leadership election

References

Cable, Vince
Cable, Vince